Ross Park Mall is a shopping mall located in Ross Township, Pennsylvania, north of Pittsburgh. The mall houses 170 retailers including anchor stores Nordstrom, Macy's, and JCPenney. An outdoor lifestyle component complements the enclosed center.

With 170 stores, Ross Park Mall is currently the sixth largest shopping mall in Pennsylvania.

History 

The mall opened in 1986.
The mall's present anchor tenants include JCPenney to the east, Macy's to the south, and Nordstrom to the northwest with one vacant anchor to the north last occupied by Sears that is yet to be redeveloped. Crate & Barrel and L.L.Bean anchor the lifestyle addition on the southwestern part of the mall property.

When the mall was originally built, a Horne's store occupied the present Nordstrom location and a Kaufmann's was in the present Macy's spot. Horne's was the second largest of Pittsburgh's department store chains, and this store had been the anchor of nearby Northway Mall; the two locations coexisted for about a year after the move. Kaufmann's was the third largest of Pittsburgh's chains, and its store moved in from a standalone location about a mile north on McKnight Road. Today, that location houses Giant Eagle, Dunham's Sports, and Stein Mart.

The Nordstrom location has a complicated history. It was intended to be a Gimbels but was never occupied because the Gimbels chain was sold and liquidated a year after the mall opened, resulting in a vacant anchor at the time. The spot was first opened by Horne's. It operated as Horne's from 1987 to 1994, when Federated Department Stores purchased the Horne's chain and rebranded its stores with its own regional Lazarus name. Service Merchandise closed March 15, 1999, and it replaced with Media Play of the same year in Thanksgiving 1999. The store operated as Lazarus until Federated renamed it as Macy's in March 2005. Four months later, Federated purchased the May Department Stores Company, which operated the Kaufmann's anchor store at the south end of the mall. Now Federated owned two anchors in the same mall, operating under different names. However, Media Play closed in 2006, and it replaced by Forever 21. In March 2006, Nordstrom announced plans to build a new store on the Horne's/Lazarus/Macy's site, after tearing down the building and an adjacent two-level parking structure. May quickly closed the Macy's store and began converting the much larger Kaufmann's to a Macy's. In September 2006, the former Kaufmann's became Macy's, which then renovated the entire store with replacement of flooring and lighting, also relocating the furniture department to the original Horne's furniture gallery located in the parking lot. After a two-year construction period, the Nordstrom store opened on October 24, 2008.

An interesting experiment took place at the former Sears store. From 1987 to 1991, a McDonald's restaurant was on the first floor near the lawn mower department. While restaurants in department stores was not a new concept, a fast food restaurant was. Other Sears stores attempted similar undertakings with moderate success.

Renovation and expansion 
In 2000, Ross Park underwent $14 million in renovations including the construction of a play area for children near JCPenney as well as new lighting, ceilings, entranceways and flooring. Additional renovations were done in 2008 with the mall expansion, incorporating a Nordstrom department store. Some luxury retailers were also added to the mall. A  lifestyle addition completed the 2008 expansion. The expansion will contains four or five new tenants, including two eateries, and all stores are accessible from the outside. 

On January 4, 2018, Sears announced that its store at the mall would be closing as part of a plan to close 103 stores nationwide. The store closed on April 8, 2018, making JCPenney the only original anchor store to remain. One day later, Simon announced plans to redevelop the two-story space into a new three-story space with a new dining hall, new retailers, restaurants, and entertainment. It's one of the seven malls owned by Simon that will redevelop a former Sears. Construction will start in January 2019 and open during summer 2020.

Prior to the 2019 holiday shopping season, JCPenney reopened on a single level.

In 2020, Jim Shorkey Mitsubishi opened in the former Kaufmann's furniture gallery building.

After the Coronavirus Temporary Shutdown 
Prior to the coronavirus pandemic, Simon Property Group planned to reconstruct the former Sears department store into a three story space with more retail stores, food and beverage offerings, and an AMC Theater on the third floor. As of January 2022, there is no update pertaining to the future redevelopment plans of this former department store. As of March 27, 2022, there were 16 empty storefronts, including the upper level of J.C. Penney and the former Sears department store. In the Summer 2023, Amazon will open a 45,000 SQ FT Amazon Fresh grocery store in the former upper level J.C Penny with interior mall and mall parking exterior entrances.

Shooting and Evacuation 
On Saturday, May 29, 2021, at approximately 4:34 p.m., a shooting occurred on the upper level near J. Crew, involving 5-6 individuals, at least two of them being juveniles. People fled from the mall while others hid where they could find safety. Two of the six individuals were detained initially and the civilians still in the mall were escorted out by the police. No one was injured from the shooting. After the shooting that occurred on May 29, 2021, Simon Property Group was criticized for not having security cameras installed in their facility. This was after multiple attempts were made prior to the shooting to have video surveillance installed in all their properties.

Anchors and major stores
JCPenney
Macy's
Nordstrom
Crate & Barrel
LL Bean
The Cheesecake Factory
Amazon Fresh
Tiffany & Co.
American Eagle
Pottery Barn
LEGO
Zara
Apple Store
H&M

References

External links 

 Ross Park Mall
 Tiffany Co. chain finds local home at Ross Park Mall
Ross Park Mall review
Guide To Ross Park Mall

Shopping malls in Metro Pittsburgh
Simon Property Group
Shopping malls established in 1986